The mangrove sunbird or mouse-brown sunbird (Anthreptes gabonicus) is a species of bird in the family Nectariniidae.
Its range covers areas near the Gulf of Guinea (on either side of the Dahomey Gap), from Senegal to northwestern Angola.

Its natural habitat is subtropical or tropical mangrove forests.

References

mangrove sunbird
Birds of the African tropical rainforest
mangrove sunbird
Taxonomy articles created by Polbot